The Royal Foundation of The Prince and Princess of Wales is a charity which supports the work of the Prince and Princess of Wales. Their projects revolve around conservation, the early years, mental health, and the emergency services.

History

Originally named The Foundation of Prince William and Prince Harry, the foundation was set up in September 2009 to enable Prince William and his brother, Prince Harry to take forward their charitable ambitions. Catherine Middleton (now Princess of Wales) and Meghan Markle (now Duchess of Sussex) later joined as patrons of the Foundation in 2011 and 2018 upon marriage. The Duke and Duchess of Sussex left the Foundation in June 2019.

Activities
In the month ahead of their wedding in April 2011, William and Catherine set up a gift fund to allow well-wishers to donate money to charities they care about in lieu of gifts. The gift fund supported 26 charities of the couple's choice, incorporating the armed forces, children, the elderly, art, sport and conservation. The fund eventually raised over £1m for the respective organisations.

The Foundation awarded its first grant in April 2011, to Fields in Trust, a charity which protects parks and green spaces across the UK. In June 2011, the Foundation partnered with ARK in developing their "Expanding Horizons" programme, which aims to support the lives of children. On 8 January 2012, the Foundation announced partnership with The Forces in Mind Trust to support former UK military personnel and their families. In July 2012, the Coach Core initiative was launched by the Prince and Princess of Wales and Prince Harry, which provides sports apprenticeship for undereducated and unprivileged youth. Coach Core celebrated its first graduation in January 2015, with a reception held at St. James' Palace. In 2018, the Coach Core Awards took place at Loughborough University, celebrating the achievements of apprentices and graduates. As of 2018, Coach Core has had over 400 apprentices and graduates across 10 locations.

In July 2014, the Foundation, alongside True Colours Trust, launched Pallative Care Pilot, a programme to test  methods to supporting families with life-limiting or life-threatening conditions. Later that year, the Foundation established the Full Effect project alongside St. Ann's, which supports young and adolescent children find support to avoid the increase of youth violence. The project provided after-school programmes for 250 children per week, and piloted an anti-knife crime resource in several primary schools across Nottingham. In May 2016, the Prince of Wales created the Taskforce on the Prevention of Cyberbullying, recruiting industry partners to develop a response to the online bullying of young people.  In November 2017, the Prince launched the Stop Speak Support Campaign, designed from the research from the Taskforce on the Prevention of Cyberbullying, to help young people advocate against online bullying.

The Royal Foundation Forum was held at the end of February 2018 with all of them in attendance. Under the theme "Making A Difference Together," the event in central London showcased programmes run or initiated by the Royal Foundation, such as Heads Together, the Invictus Games, and United For Wildlife.
In November 2019, the Foundation launched Step into Energy, in partnership with NextOp as part of the Veterans Transatlantic Partnership, to help UK and US military veterans gain work in the energy sector, with a focus on employment and mental health.

In July 2020, the Foundation established an emergency response fund to address the impact of the COVID-19 pandemic, through which they granted £1.8 million to 10 charities that benefit mental health issues, new mothers, education, and helping frontline workers. In August 2022, the Foundation reported an income of £20.4 million for 2021, an increase from £6.7 million in 2019. £16.4 million were spent on charitable activities, £12.1 million of which was for the Earthshot Prize. In the same month, it was reported that the foundation kept £1.1m with JPMorgan Chase, known for its investments in fossil fuels, as well as £1.7m in a fund managed by Cazenove Capital, which owns shares in food companies criticised for buying palm oil due to its environmental impacts. Kensington Palace responded to the reports, stating: "The Royal Foundation has followed the Church of England guidelines on ethical investment since 2015, and goes beyond these to prohibit investment in fossil fuel companies". It was added that Cazenove was required to follow a strict investment policy based on the Church of England investment guidance.

Conservation

United for Wildlife

In September 2014, William founded the United for Wildlife initiative and launched the Transport Taskforce, made up of seven conservation organisations, which aims to reduce worldwide illegal wildlife trade and protect natural resources. The Taskforce pledges to increase the global response to worldwide conservation crises. Over 68,000 industry employees have since been trained to work against illegal wildlife trade. The Taskforce has supported 52 law investigations, 8 trafficker arrests, and over 180 trafficking alerts to customs agencies. In March 2016, the Taskforce led the signing of a declaration at Buckingham Palace to shut down illegal trafficking routes and increase information and research sharing, composed of 45 signatories globally.

In 2017, the Taskforce produced a film, I Am a Ranger, which explained the mission and dangers of wildlife rangers in Africa. The film won the award for Best Micro Movie at the Jackson Hole Film Festival. In October 2018, the Taskforce signed the Mansion House declaration, which committed 30 global banks and financial organisations to fight against illegal wildlife trade. In May 2019, the Prince held a Taskforce meeting with both the financial and transport sectors of the group to discuss joint efforts and successes in the area. In March 2023, a partnership was announced between the United for Wildlife and InterPortPolice.

Earthshot Prize 

On 31 December 2019, after consulting various organisations and experts, the Prince and Princess of Wales announced the Earthshot Prize, run by the Foundation, to be given to five individuals or organisations who could come up with impactful and sustainable solutions for earth's environmental problems between 2021 and 2030.

The project was launched in October 2020; and is slated to give £50 million in funds over the next decade, in accordance with five categories detailing the restoration and protection of nature, air cleanliness, ocean revival, waste-free living and climate action. The Prize is backed by a global alliance of environmental organizations; including WWF, Greenpeace, Oceana, Conservation International. The project was also set up to align with the United Nations's Sustainable Development Goals. The Prize will be judged by an appointed council composed of 13 members, including David Attenborough, Hindou Oumarou Ibrahim, and Christiana Figueres.

Submissions for the first Prize ceremony opened in November 2020. The first ceremony took place on 21 October 2021 in London. In July 2022, it was announced that after being a part of the Royal Foundation for two years, the Earthshot Prize had become an independent charity.

Mental health
In February 2014, the Princess of Wales launched Moving Parents and Children Together, also known as M-PACT Plus, in partnership with Place2Be and Action on Addiction. The initiative provided early support and counseling for children ages 8–17 impacted by parental drug abuse. 77 schools were reached during the pilot phase of the one-to-one counseling program, and 283 Place2Be volunteers were trained through the programme to reach over 26,000 children. The project was subsequently merged with Action on Addiction's M-PACT parent programme. In July 2017 and in response to the Grenfell Tower fire, the foundation launched the Support4Grenfell Community Hub in north Kensington in collaboration with charities such as Child Bereavement UK, Winston's Wish and Place2Be. It was tasked to provide emotional support to survivors and those affected. In October 2017, the Foundation and the Ministry of Defence signed an agreement to work together on efforts to change the conversation of mental health across His Majesty's Armed Forces. On World Mental Health Day in 2017, The Royal Foundation announced it had granted £2 million to establish Mental Health Innovations, a mental health charity, developing new ways to discuss mental health using digital innovation.

In January 2018, Catherine launched Mentally Healthy Schools, an online initiative for primary school teachers and staff, providing free access on resources to support children's mental health in the classroom. The Princess held sessions for the programme at the Mental Health in Education Conference in 2019. After two years of development, the website had over 250,000 visitors to the site accessing resources. The project was subsequently handed to the Anna Freud Centre, who continues to develop and expand its curriculum for secondary schools.

In November 2022, the Royal Foundation, in collaboration with the Two Ridings Community Foundation, announced £345,000 worth of funding for local communities and organisations in Scarborough that support young people's mental health through their work. In the same month, the foundation announced that it would "provide advice and support" for Ukrainian first lady Olena Zelenska's mental health initiative, which is meant to address the impact of the Russian invasion of Ukraine on the mental wellbeing of Ukrainians. In February 2023, the Foundation partnered with Life at No.27, a horticultural therapy and mental health counselling provider, to create therapy allotments and gardens that will provide support for individuals facing mental health difficulties in communities across South Wales.

Heads Together
In 2017, the Foundation launched Heads Together, led by the Prince and Princess of Wales and Prince Harry, aiming to tackle the stigma of mental health and provide supportive resources.  The campaign was first envisioned by the Princess earlier that year. Catherine later voluntarily talked about her problems as a mother, and admitted that she suffered a "lack of confidence" and "feelings of ignorance" during certain periods of time. In 2017, the campaign launched #OKtoSay, a series of films to encourage the conversation around mental health. Later that year, Heads Together partnered with the 2017 London Marathon with 750 runners participating in the Mental Health Marathon.

In September 2018, William launched Mental Health at Work, a Heads Together initiative, which aims to change the approach to workplace mental health in the UK. The programme served 100,000 site visitors within the first six months. In May 2019, the Prince partnered with The Football Association to launch Heads Up, a campaign that utilizes football to affect the conversation surrounding mental health. In January 2020, all games in the third round of the FA cup were postponed by a minute in support of the campaign. That season, all football games across the men's and women's calendar were dedicated to Head's Up and the conversation on mental health. Later that month, the Prince and Princess of Wales launched Shout, an affiliate of Crisis Text Line in the U.K. that offers free, confidential mental health support through text in the United Kingdom 24/7. In June 2020, the Prince of Wales revealed he had been serving as a volunteer during the COVID-19 pandemic. As of November 2020, the programme has facilitated over half a million conversations.

Invictus Games
£1m of funding for Prince Harry's Invictus Games project was provided by The Royal Foundation, with an equal amount being pledged by Chancellor George Osborne from Treasury funds generated by fines imposed on banks as a result of the Libor scandal. In 2020, the Invictus Games Foundation had a £1.77 million income, £560,000 of which came from a grant by The Royal Foundation's Endeavour Fund that was set up by Harry in 2012.

Early years

In March 2018, the Princess of Wales hosted a symposium at the Royal Society of Medicine, focusing on children's health, and launched the Foundation's Early Intervention Support initiative, which would raise awareness of issues including as youth, maternal, and mental health, as well as parental and educational support and resources. It was announced that a steering group would research solutions to problems facing young people, and how it impacted society and the economy. In July 2020, Catherine supported and assisted in the development of BBC's "Tiny Happy People" initiative, providing free digital resources to parents with young children.

In January 2020, Catherine launched "5 Big Questions on the Under 5's", a nationwide survey on the development of the early years.  The survey was commissioned from Ipsos MORI, and contains "further qualitative and ethnographic research" on the early years. The survey received over 500,000 responses. In November 2020, the Foundation hosted online Early Years forum, composed of medical and psychological speakers, where the Princess gave a keynote speech surrounding the results of the survey and the importance of childhood development. The results of the survey were listed as "5 Big Insights", being: data about the societal perspective on the early years in relation to childhood development, the sustainability of parental wellbeing, the effect of peer judgment on parental mental health, the effect of isolation during the COVID-19 pandemic, and the varying amount of health and support in wider communities.

Royal Foundation Centre for Early Childhood
In June 2021, Catherine launched the Royal Foundation Centre for Early Childhood, which will conduct work, research, and campaigns with other organisations on the importance of the early years. The centre is set to be run by staff from the foundation and seeks to elevate the importance of early childhood as a social issue. The Princess stated her intentions of "creat[ing] a happier, more mentally healthy, more nurturing society". The centre's inaugural report, Big Change Starts Small, was published alongside the launch and written in collaboration with Harvard University and the London School of Economics.

In February 2022, the Princess of Wales visited Denmark on behalf of the Royal Foundation Centre for Early Childhood. She visited University of Copenhagen and met officials from the Center for Early Intervention and Family Studies. The Princess visited Stenurten Forest School, to learn about its approach to learning, which focuses on the students' social and emotional development rather than academic skills. In June 2022, Catherine hosted a roundtable with government ministers, including Health Secretary Sajid Javid and Minister for Families Will Quince, as well as senior civil servants, and the early years sector, to discuss the results of the foundation's research, which demonstrated that 90% of the UK population believe that the early years are important in determining children's future well-being, while about 20% recognise the crucial importance of the first five years.

In January 2023, Christian Guy was named director of the Royal Foundation Centre for Early Childhood. Eight professionals from academia, science and the early years sector were announced as the centre's advisory group: Peter Fonagy, Eamon McCrory, Alain Gregoire, Trudi Seneviratne, Ed Vainker, Carey Oppenheim, Imran Hussain, and Beverley Barnett‑Jones. On 31st January, the centre launched the Shaping Us initiative, a long-term campaign aimed at raising awareness about the importance of early childhood development until the age of 5. The launching event was held at the BAFTA headquarters in London and attended by scientists and celebrities. A 90-second animation was also released to be shown ahead of cinema screenings in the UK cinemas and on advertising screens in Piccadilly Circus. The group Practitioners of the Early Years Sector responded to the campaign by stating that besides awareness "long-term investment and funding" was needed.

Emergency responders

In April 2020, the Foundation supported the launch of Our Frontline, a mental health support initiative for emergency workers. It provides digital and online resources, as well as remote counseling, to support workers' mental health. In September 2020, the Prince of Wales established the Emergency Responders Senior Leaders Board, commissioned by the foundation to research the mental health and wellbeing of emergency responders. The project is in partnership with King's College London and the Open University. As part of the COVID-19 fund, over 250,000 emergency responders accessed mental health resources through the Blue Light programme, with 2,780 hours of support provided from the Ambulance Staff Charity.

References

External links
 The Royal Foundation
 The Royal Foundation Centre for Early Childhood
 Charity Commission (for England and Wales) Charity Number 1132048

2009 establishments in the United Kingdom
British monarchy
British Royal Family charities
Charities based in London
Organizations established in 2009
Social welfare charities based in the United Kingdom
William, Prince of Wales
Catherine, Princess of Wales